Pristimantis acerus is a species of frog in the family Strabomantidae. It is endemic to Ecuador and known from the area of its type locality between Papallacta and Cuyujúathe in the Napo Province and from the Llanganates National Park, Pastaza Province. This species is rated as Endangered by the IUCN. Common name Papallacta robber frog has been coined for it.

Etymology
The specific name acerus is Greek and refers to the absence of tubercles on the eyelid, heel, and tarsus.

Description
Three males in the type series measure  and the only female  in snout–vent length. The snout is subacuminate in dorsal view and pointed or protruding in lateral profile. The canthus rostralis is relatively sharp. The tympanum is distinct. Both fingers and toes bear broad discs; the fingers have ill-defined lateral fringes and the toes indistinct lateral keels. The dorsum is black or dark grey; dorsal skin is smooth. The venter is dark grey to dark greyish brown. Males have creamy brown throats.

Habitat
Pristimantis acerus is known from the cloud forests of the Andes at elevations between  asl. Likely threat to this species is deforestation caused by agriculture, logging, and human settlements.

References

External links
 Photos of Pristimantis acerus on Arkiv.org

acerus
Amphibians of the Andes
Amphibians of Ecuador
Endemic fauna of Ecuador
Amphibians described in 1980
Taxa named by William Edward Duellman
Taxa named by John Douglas Lynch